Dunstall Park railway station was a station north of Wolverhampton Low Level railway station on the Great Western Railway's London Paddington to Birkenhead via Birmingham Snow Hill line. The station opened on 1 December 1896. Stafford Road engine shed and works and Oxley shed were nearby. It saw high traffic due to the nearby Wolverhampton Racecourse but closed in 1968 when services between Wolverhampton and Shrewsbury were switched to  Wolverhampton High Level.

It was the first stop north from the Low Level station, and was served by local trains towards Shrewsbury, as well as those on the Wombourne Branch Line to Stourbridge.

The station site has since been demolished although freight and passenger trains still pass through the site. There is a bricked up pedestrian entrance and ramp to the former station.

Immediately south of the station site is the short connecting line to the Stafford-Wolverhampton line.  This freight-only line was mostly used by coal trains to Ironbridge Power Station in recent years.

References

Rail Around Birmingham and the West Midlands: Dunstall Park railway station

Further reading

Disused railway stations in Wolverhampton
Former Great Western Railway stations
Railway stations in Great Britain opened in 1896
Railway stations in Great Britain closed in 1917
Railway stations in Great Britain opened in 1919
Railway stations in Great Britain closed in 1968